Thomas Edward Linnenbrink is an electrical engineer with the Hittite Microwave Corporation of Colorado Springs, Colorado. He was named a Fellow of the Institute of Electrical and Electronics Engineers (IEEE) in 2012 for his work in standards for instrumentation and measurement systems.

References

Fellow Members of the IEEE
Living people
Year of birth missing (living people)
Place of birth missing (living people)
American electrical engineers